Kota-nand-uru is a village in Kakinada district in the state of Andhra Pradesh in India.

Geography
It has an average elevation of 37 meters (124 feet).

References 

Villages in Kakinada district